is a public park in Toshima Ward, Tokyo, Japan. It is the largest public park in Toshima Ward. The total park area includes the area of the Minami-Nagasaki Sports Center building and the football pitch. The area of the grassy section of the park excluding the football pitch is about 3,204 m2.

History
Minami-Nagasaki Sports Park is an urban planning park that was built on the site of the former Nagasaki Junior High School, which was completed in May 1950. The school closed in 2006 due to a fall in the number of students. Based on answers to an Internet questionnaire, the park was made a sports and disaster-prevention location.
The park contains a memorial plaque to Nagasaki Junior High School.

Facilities
There is a sports center, football (soccer) pitch (multipurpose square), open space with a lawn, and in summer there is a small fountain and water area (called Jabu-Jabu Ike (Splashing Pond)). There is play equipment for children including swings and slides. As a disaster-prevention facility, the park has a water-sampling port, a manhole that can serve as a temporary toilet, and a bench that can be used as a small oven.
The park also offers access to existing disaster-prevention wells and fire-prevention water tanks.

Gallery

See also
 Parks and gardens in Tokyo
 National Parks of Japan

References

 www.city.toshima.lg.jp

External links
 shisetsu.jp

Parks and gardens in Tokyo